Maroz is a Belarusian surname meaning "frost". Notable people with the surname include:
 Henadz Maroz (born 1978), Belarusian high jumper
 Ivan Maroz (born 1992), Belarusian handball player
 Uladzimir Maroz (born 1985), Belarusian professional footballer

See also
 
 Moroz, Ukrainian equivalent
 Mráz, Czech and Slovak equivalent
 Mróz, Polish equivalent

Belarusian-language surnames